St Andrew's Church, Radbourne is a Grade I listed parish church in the Church of England in Radbourne, Derbyshire.

History

The church dates from the 13th century, with additions in the 14th, 15th and 17th centuries. The porch was added in 1792, and the church was repaired in 1844. The tower and vestry were added in 1874.

The church contains carved bench ends dating from the 14th century which were originally in Dale Abbey.

The church has memorials to the Pole and de la Pole families including one to German Pole, MP for Derbyshire in 1656. The memorial dates from 1684 is generally attributed to Grinling Gibbons.

Organ

The organ dates from 1888 and is by Peter Conacher. A specification of the organ can be found on the National Pipe Organ Register.

Parish status

The church is in a joint parish with 
St John the Baptist's Church, Boylestone
St Michael and All Angels' Church, Church Broughton
St Chad's Church, Longford
All Saints' Church, Dalbury
Christ Church, Long Lane
St Michael's Church, Sutton-on-the-Hill
All Saints’ Church, Trusley

See also
Grade I listed churches in Derbyshire
Grade I listed buildings in Derbyshire
Listed buildings in Radbourne, Derbyshire

References

Church of England church buildings in Derbyshire
Grade I listed churches in Derbyshire